Carroll Hall Shelby (January 11, 1923 – May 10, 2012) was an American automotive designer, racing driver, and entrepreneur. Shelby is best known for his involvement with the AC Cobra and Mustang for Ford Motor Company, which he modified during the late 1960s and early 2000s. He established Shelby American in 1962 to manufacture and market performance vehicles. His autobiography, The Carroll Shelby Story, was published in 1967. As a race car driver, his highlight was as a co-driver of the winning 1959 24 Hours of Le Mans entry.

Early life
Carroll Shelby was born on January 11, 1923, to Warren Hall Shelby, a rural mail carrier, and his wife, Eloise Shelby (nee Lawrence), in Leesburg, Texas. Shelby suffered from heart valve leakage problems by age 7 and experienced several health-related complications throughout his life. From a young age, Shelby was fascinated with the concept of speed, which led to an interest in cars and airplanes. He moved to Dallas, Texas, at age 7 with his family, and around age 10, he would ride his bicycle to dirt tracks nearby to watch races. Eager for a car of his own, at age 15, he was driving and taking care of his father's Ford. Shelby's education as a pilot began in the military in November 1941 at the San Antonio Aviation Cadet Center, later known as Lackland Air Force Base. Before racing and building cars, Shelby was a poultry farmer, which was a livelihood he continued until 1952.

Pre-racing
Shelby honed his driving skills with his Willys automobile while attending Woodrow Wilson High School in Dallas, Texas, graduating in 1940. He later enrolled at The Georgia Institute of Technology in the Aeronautical Engineering program. After enlisting in the United States Army Air Corps, Shelby began pilot training in November 1941. He graduated with the rank of staff sergeant pilot in September 1942 at Ellington Field. In December 1942, he was commissioned as a second lieutenant after undergoing air students' training, later serving as a flight instructor and test pilot in the Beechcraft AT-11 Kansan and Curtiss AT-9 Jeep. He went on to fly the Douglas B-18 Bolo, the North American B-25 Mitchell, the Douglas A-26 Invader, and finally the Boeing B-29 Superfortress at Denver, Colorado, before being discharged following V-J Day.

After the war, he started his own dump truck business, worked briefly as an oil-well roughneck from 1948–49, and then as a poultry farmer before going bankrupt.

Driving career

Shelby started driving professionally at age 29.Starting out as an amateur, Shelby raced his friend Ed Wilkin's MG TC in January 1952 at the Grand Prairie Naval Air Station drag meet, followed by other races. Then, he raced Charles Brown's Cadillac-Allards at Caddo Mills, Texas. At the end of 1952, Shelby won 4 races, taking home only trophies, not accepting any prize money.

In 1953, Shelby raced Brown's Cad-Allard, followed by Roy Cherryhomes' Cad-Allard, winning 8 or 9 races. Then in 1954, he drove in the Mil Kilometros de la Ciudad de Buenos Aires, sponsored by the Automobile Club of Argentina and the Sports Car Club of America. This is where he met John Wyer, Aston Martin's team manager, who asked Shelby to drive their DBR3 at Sebring. The DBR3 did not finish Sebring in 1954 due to a broken rear axle.

Shelby traveled to Europe in April 1954, where he raced a DBR3 for John Wyer at Aintree, followed by Le Mans. Teaming up with Graham Whitehead, their Aston Martin took fifth at the Thousand Kilometers at Monza on 27 June. He then drove in the 3-car factory team effort at Silverstone on 17 July with Peter Collins and Roy Salvadori, all three cars taking the three top places. 

In August 1954, Shelby drove with Donald Healey, and his team. In an Austin-Healey 100S and supercharged 100S, they set Class D National speed records at the Bonneville Salt Flats. Shelby, Healey, Captain G.E.T. Eyston, Mortimer Morris Goodall, and Roy Jackson-Moore set about 70 new records, with Shelby setting 17 on his own.

Shelby was severely injured in a crash while racing an Austin-Healey in the Carrera Panamericana. Though he underwent eight months of operations, he continued to drive in 1955, winning about ten races, and a second-place showing at Sebring driving Allen Guiberson's Ferrari Monza. He then started driving Tony Paravano's Ferraris in August 1955. He won a further 30 races with the Ferrari in 1956, started driving for John Edgar, and opened Carroll Shelby Sports Cars in Dallas.

He drove in the Mount Washington Hillclimb Auto Race in a specially prepared Ferrari 375 GP roadster, to a record run of 10 minutes, 21.8 seconds on his way to victory in 1956. He also set records at Giants Despair Hillclimb, and raced at Brynfan Tyddyn.

He was Sports Illustrated magazine's driver of the year in 1956 and 1957.

Racing John Edgar's 4.5-liter Maserati at the Riverside International Raceway in September 1957, he was involved in a crash that caused injuries requiring 72 stitches and plastic surgery for broken bones in his nose and cheekbones. However, he returned in November, winning with the same car at the same course, against Masten Gregory and Dan Gurney.

Shelby joined John Wyer and the Aston Martin team in Europe and drove a DBR3 at the Belgian Sports Car Grand Prix on 18 May 1958, followed by a DBR1 at the Nürburgring 1000 km with co-driver Salvadori. Shelby was teamed up with Salvadori at Le Mans, but Shelby came down with dysentery and had to be replaced by Stuart Lewis-Evans after a few hours into the race. Shelby then drove a Maserati 250F for Mimo Dei's Scuderia Centro Sud in 3 Grand Prix races to gain Formula 1 and open-wheel car experience, including the Portuguese Grand Prix. Shelby finished the year driving John Edgar's 4.5L Maserati in the Tourist Trophy at Nassau.

Shelby and Salvadori started the 1959 sports car season by driving the DBR1/300 at Sebring in March. In June, Shelby drove Wolfgang Seidel's Porsche in the Nürburgring 1000 km. The highlight of his racing career came in June 1959 when he co-drove an Aston Martin DBR1 (with Englishman Roy Salvadori) to victory in the 1959 24 Hours of Le Mans. In September, Shelby drove with Jack Fairman in the Goodwood Tourist Trophy.

The 1959 Grand Prix season saw Shelby driving the Aston Martin DBR4 in the Dutch Grand Prix in May, followed by the British Grand Prix at Aintree in July. Shelby then drove in the Portuguese Grand Prix in August, followed by the Italian Grand Prix in September.

Shelby finished the 1959 racing season driving Casner Motor Racing Division's Birdcage Maserati at the Nassau races in December. In January 1960, he drove Temple Buell's Maserati 250F in the New Zealand Grand Prix, then Camoradi's Porsche in the Cuban Gran Premio Libertad, then their 2.9-liter Birdcage Maserati at Sebring. He won the Grand Prix at Riverside driving one of "Lucky" Cassner's Birdcage Maseratis, and then won the Castle Rock race in June, driving a Scarab. He finished the year driving Max Balchowsky's "Old Yeller II" in the Road America, then a Birdcage Maserati in the Pacific Grand Prix and the Los Angeles Times Grand Prix, which was his last race.

According to Shelby, "...winning the Twenty-four Hours was probably the greatest thrill I ever got out of racing. I can think of plenty of other races that carry their quota of thrills for the winner, but when you win this one it kind of gives you license to go out and tell people you're good, and that often helps get some other deals together."

In 1961, Shelby, along with Pete Brock, opened the Shelby School of High Performance Driving at the Riverside track.

As constructor

Shelby's visits to "limited-production factories in Europe" caused him to realize that “America was missing a big bet, a winning bet ... the design and production of an all-purpose, all-American sports or grand touring car that you could drive to market and also race during the weekend..."

After retiring from driving in October 1960 for health reasons, Shelby opened a high-performance driving school and the Shelby-American performance equipment and customization company in the Los Angeles area. Shelby became interested in the potential of the AC Ace chassis, especially after Bristol Aeroplane Company stopped building automobile engines, and the sales with the Ford Zephyr engine were declining in September 1961. Shelby contacted Charles Hurlock of AC, who agreed to provide the chassis on credit. Dave Evans of Ford Motor Company agreed to provide  and  V8 engines with transmissions also on credit. The new car, called the Carroll Shelby Experimental or CSX0001, was marketed as the Shelby AC Cobra, then AC Cobra, and eventually, the Ford Cobra. Production began in March 1962, with 75 cars sold by the end of the year. One hundred cars had been built by April 1963, the first 75 with the 260-cubic-inch engine, followed by a  engine. The 427 Cobra prototype was built in October 1964.

Shelby started racing his creation in October 1962 at Riverside, with Billy Krause driving the CSX0002. Racing experience from 1963 indicated that further modifications were necessary to make the Cobra competitive with the Ferrari GT cars; in particular, the AC roadster body needed to be replaced with a lower-drag enclosed coupe body for high-speed circuits. The result was the Shelby Daytona Coupe, which took three GT class wins on the 1964 World Sportscar Championship GT circuit, including Le Mans and the Tourist Trophy at Goodwood, plus the Sports Car Club of America's U.S. GT Championship. Then in 1965, Shelby American Cobra won the International Championship for GT Manufacturers.

After success with the Daytona Coupe in 1964, Shelby-American became more heavily involved in Ford's GT40 Sports Prototype racing program, which had experienced disappointing results. Shelby made changes to running gear, particularly transmissions, to improve reliability, and designed their GT40 Mark II variant around Ford's  engine. In 1966, the Mark II earned Ford the overall Constructors' title in the World Sportscar Championship with their 1-2-3 finish at Le Mans. Ford was also developing a radical new prototype with a lightweight chassis based on aluminum honeycomb panels. Shelby was brought in to finalize the development of the car after the project experienced setbacks in 1966, which included the death of driver Ken Miles in August. The Mark IV was introduced for the 1967 12 Hours of Sebring and finished in first place. It was prepared for Le Mans and another record-breaking finish. Driver Dan Gurney shook and sprayed champagne on the podium and started a tradition. The Mark IV was Shelby's last prototype racer, as new limits on engine displacement for that class eliminated Ford's engines.

Shelby's early racing successes led to a joint effort of Ford and Shelby-American to produce the Mustang-based Shelby GT350, starting in 1965, then the Shelby GT500, starting in 1967. Shelby produced those cars through 1968, then subsequent cars with the Shelby GT brand were produced in-house by Ford.

After parting with Ford, Shelby moved on to help develop performance cars with divisions of the two other Big 3 American companies: Dodge (Chrysler) and Oldsmobile (General Motors).

In the intervening years, Shelby had a series of ventures start and stop relating to the production of "completion" Cobras — cars that were allegedly built using "leftover" parts and frames. In the 1960s, the FIA required entrants (Shelby, Ford, Ferrari, etc.) to produce at least 100 cars for homologated classes of racing. Shelby simply ordered an insufficient number of cars and skipped a large block of Vehicle Identification Numbers, to create the illusion the company had imported large numbers of cars. Decades later in the 1990s, Carroll alleged that he had found the "leftover" frames, and began selling cars that were supposedly finally "completed". After it was discovered the cars were built from scratch in collaboration with McCluskey, Ltd., they were re-termed "continuation" Cobras. The cars are still built to this day, known as the current CSX4000 series of Cobras.

Shelby was inducted into the International Motorsports Hall of Fame in 1991, the Motorsports Hall of Fame of America in 1992, the Automotive Hall of Fame in 1992, and the Diecast Hall of Fame in 2009. He was also inducted into the SCCA Hall of Fame on March 2, 2013.

In 2003, Ford Motor Co. and Carroll Shelby resumed ties and he became technical advisor to the Ford GT project. In that same year, he formed Carroll Shelby International, Inc., based in Nevada.

Partnership with Dodge
Shelby began working with Dodge at the request of Chrysler Corporation chairman Lee Iacocca. Iacocca had previously been responsible for bringing Shelby to the Ford Mustang. After almost a decade of tuning work, Shelby was brought on board as the "Performance Consultant" on the Dodge Viper Technical Policy Committee made up of Chrysler's executive Bob Lutz, Product Design chief Tom Gale, and Engineering Vice President François Castaing. Shelby's wealth of experience helped make the Viper as light and powerful as possible.

The following cars were modified by Shelby and bore his name, but sold under the Dodge marque:
 1983–1984 Dodge Shelby Charger
 1985–1987 Dodge Charger Shelby
 1984–1986 Dodge Omni GLH
 1996 Dodge Viper RT/10 CS (50 units approved for production however only 19 were actually built: 18 1995/1996 RTs were built (16 white with blue stripes, 1 blue white stripes, 1 black with gold emblem on the hood and one 1997 GTS Shelby S/C (Street Competition) which was red with gold stripes.)

The following cars used Shelby-modified parts, but were not overseen by Carroll Shelby:
 1986 Dodge Daytona Turbo Z C/S
 1987–1988 Dodge Daytona Shelby Z
 1988–1991 Dodge Daytona C/S
 1989–1991 Dodge Daytona Shelby
 1988–1989 Dodge Lancer Shelby
 1989–1990 Dodge Shadow Competition
 1991–1992 Dodge Spirit R/T
 1992–1993 Dodge Daytona IROC R/T
 1999–2000 Dodge Durango S.P. 360

The following cars were limited production vehicles and modified at Shelby's Whittier, California, plant, and then sold as Shelbys:
 1986 Shelby GLH-S (based on the Dodge Omni GLH) (500 produced)
 1987 Shelby GLH-S (based on the Dodge Charger Shelby) (1,000 produced)
 1987 Shelby Lancer (based on the Dodge Lancer) (800 produced, 400 with a Leather Interior/Automatic Trans. and 400 with a Cloth Interior/5 spd. Trans.)
 1987 Shelby CSX (based on the Dodge Shadow) (750 produced)
 1988 Shelby CSX-T (based on the Dodge Shadow) (1,000 produced)
 1989 Shelby Dakota (based on the Dodge Dakota) (1,500 produced)
 1989 Shelby CSX-VNT (based on the Dodge Shadow) (500 produced)

Above information citation

Shelby Series 1

 Shelby's Series 1 roadster used Oldsmobile's 4.0 L L47 Aurora V8, which was chosen because it was the selected engine by Indy for that year but was poorly supported by the ailing GM division. Shelby had already built an Aurora-engined sports prototype together with Racefab in 1997, in an attempt to continue his single-make Can-Am series.

The Series 1 is the only car ever produced by Carroll Shelby from a clean sheet of paper, and built from the ground up. All other Shelbys were re-engineered models produced by other manufacturers and then modified by Shelby.

Prior to production of the Series 1, significant costs were incurred in testing and certification required to conform to 1999 Federal Motor Vehicle Safety Standards. Once completed, a total of 249 production Series 1 cars were constructed by Shelby American as model year 1999 cars.

During production, Venture Corporation purchased Shelby American, Inc. The purchase included the Series 1 model, but not the rights to produce the "Continuation Series" Shelby Cobras. In 2004, after a subsequent bankruptcy by Venture Corporation (unrelated to the acquisition of Shelby American), Carroll Shelby's new company, Shelby Automobiles, Inc., purchased the Series 1 assets for pennies on the dollar. Included in the asset purchase were enough components to produce several more complete Series 1s.

Because the 1999 Federal Motor Vehicle Safety Standards certificate had expired, and the cost to re-certify the car was prohibitive, all Series 1's produced after that date were completed as "component cars" and delivered with no engine or transmission. Those "component car" models built in 2005 are identified with a seven-digit vehicle identification number (VIN) and were designated with a CSX5000 series serial number. The original 249 were production cars with a seventeen-digit VIN.

The Series 1 was produced in both supercharged and normally aspirated versions. Supercharged cars were also outfitted by the factory with larger brakes and a heavy-duty clutch. Performance is near "supercar" category with a 0 to 60 mph time at 4.1 seconds for the supercharged version. The Series 1 had power steering, power disc brakes, factory air conditioning, power windows, and an AM/FM/CD audio system. The convertible top folded away in a compartment located behind the cockpit. Some component cars were sold as roadsters, with no convertible top.

Ford-Shelby projects

In 2004, a new Ford Shelby Cobra Concept was shown off at U.S. car shows. Built with a retro body mimicking the 1960s Cobras mixed with modern touches, it was based on the Ford GT chassis (reworked for front engine/rear wheel drive) powered with a 6.4 L V10 engine that produced 605 hp (451 kW). It received overwhelmingly positive press reviews and has won the "Best In Show" award at Detroit International Auto Show.

A coupe version of the Shelby Cobra roadster was introduced the following year. The Ford Shelby GR-1 concept car of 2005. While sporting a completely modern design, it showed a nod to the 1960s Shelby Daytona. The GR-1, like the Cobra, is based on the GT's chassis. Press reviews for the GR-1 were positive. The car was featured on the cover of Motor Trend and Car Magazine. The Ford Shelby GR-1 was floated as a possibility of taking over the Ford GT's production line after its production came to an end. Neither Shelby car was built.

In 2005, Carroll Shelby built the CSM #00001 V6 Shelby Mustang CS6, to prove to Ford that he could still build high-performance cars. Its V6 produced 380HP, making it faster than Ford's V8 300HP. Because Ford thought the CS6 would hurt Ford Mustang V8 sales, Ford told Shelby to go with the V8 instead. Few CS6 Shelbys were made by Shelby; consequently, these are among the rarest Shelbys in the world.

The Shelby GT500 was revealed at the New York International Auto Show, and became available in the summer of 2006 as part of the model year 2007 lineup. It had a Tremec T-6060 manual transmission, reworked suspension geometry, 18-inch wheels, functional aerodynamic body kit, and a retro solid rear axle. The GT500 started at an MSRP of $40,930 for the coupe, and $45,755 for the convertible. Although Carroll Shelby had no hands-on involvement in the design of the car, he provided Ford and SVT (Special Vehicle Team) input on what would make the car better and convinced Ford to use wider rear tires (from 255 mm wide to 285 mm wide).

Shelby, in cooperation with the Hertz Corporation, produced 500 cars named "Shelby GT-H" in 2006, designed after the Shelby G.T.350H "Rent-a-Racer" from 1966 under a similar partnership. This was a special-edition Ford Mustang GT, available for rental from Hertz. The cars included a custom Shelby hood and black and gold body styling, incorporating a gold-plated "Hertz" nameplate on both sides.

A consumer version of the Shelby GT-H was available from Shelby through Ford dealers, called the Shelby GT. There were 5,682 vehicles for 2007 and 2,300 for 2008 were built. They had the same engine as the GT-H, but more suspension, appearance, and drivetrain upgrades and were available with either manual or automatic transmission. White and black colors were available for 2007 models and grabber orange or vista blue were available for 2008. A convertible was available in 2008 also. An available upgrade from the Shelby factory in Las Vegas were a few different superchargers. It then was called a Shelby GT/SC. All Shelby GTs are shipped with the Shelby serial number (CSM) on the dashboard badge and in the engine compartment, such as 07SGT0001 or 08SGT0001.

Non-Ford projects
In 1963 the Rootes Group, manufacturer of Sunbeam automobiles, wanted Shelby to upgrade their Alpine sports car to a more powerful version, using the Ford small-block V-8 engine, as he had done with the AC Cobra. Shelby did so and Rootes, pleased with the results, named the upgraded model the Tiger. In 1967 Chrysler bought Sunbeam and decided to use their own small block engine in the vehicle. However, their engine would not fit and marketed the cars with Ford engines until the supply ran out and the model was discontinued.

In his later years, Shelby brought several lawsuits against companies making copies of the Cobra body for use on kit cars – ostensibly for copyright, trademark, and patent violations. Despite the litigation, the Cobra kit car industry continues to thrive.

One of the lawsuits involved the Superformance Brock Coupe, a copy of the original Shelby Daytona Coupe. The Superformance Brock Coupe was designed by Pete Brock, who had also designed the original Daytona Coupe for Shelby. Shelby American sued Superformance after the company had developed and begun production of the Superformance Brock Coupe. Eventually, the litigation was settled, though the terms of the settlement have never been released to the public. As a result of the agreement between the two companies, the product is now known as the Shelby Daytona Coupe, despite being neither designed nor built by Shelby American. Nearly 150 of these new Shelby Daytona Coupes have been built as of February 2007.

In 2002, Unique Performance, a company of Farmers Branch, Texas, purchased a license from Carroll Shelby Enterprises to place his name on a series of continuation vintage vehicles. This company specialized in recreating 1960s-style Shelby Mustangs. They purchased used Mustangs and installed updated versions of the Shelby 325-horsepower 302-cubic-inch V8 engine. They also use modern five-speed manual transmissions, brakes, steering, suspension, interiors, and entertainment systems. Because Shelby's license was purchased, these cars have Shelby serial numbers.

In October 2007, Carroll Shelby ended his licensing agreement with Unique Performance due to numerous issues of customer complaints where vehicles were not delivered. Unique Performance was subsequently raided by law enforcement for VIN irregularities and declared bankruptcy, which effectively ended the Shelby continuation "Eleanor" Mustang production. Shelby was in turn sued by victims of Unique Performance for his involvement in the criminal activity,

The 2000 remake of Gone in 60 Seconds movie highlighted the star car character "Eleanor," a customized 1967 Mustang. Some custom car businesses began to reproduce "Eleanor"-looking cars with the trademarked name, causing Denice Halicki to again take legal action to protect the trademark and the copyrighted Eleanor's image. In 2008, Halicki won a case against Carroll Shelby, who was also selling "Eleanor" using the trademark name and copyrighted image.

The Scaglietti Corvette began when Gary Laughlin, a wealthy Texas oilman, and gentleman racer, had just broken the crankshaft in his Ferrari Monza. Like most Ferrari repairs, this was not going to be a cheap, simple fix. At the time, Laughlin was an active participant in the American sports car racing scene and was a close acquaintance of many of the key figures, including fellow Texan Shelby. The two had witnessed a number of V8-powered home-built specials challenge, and often defeat, the best that Europe had to offer. The idea developed that they should build a dual-purpose car based on the solid mechanicals of the Chevrolet Corvette. European-style alloy coachwork could help the chassis finally realize its potential. By chance, Laughlin owned a few Chevrolet dealerships and had a particularly valuable friend in Peter Coltrin, an automotive journalist who had gained an “in” with the influential Italians. Laughlin met with Jim Hall and Carroll Shelby to begin discussing what form their new Italian-American hybrid would take. The general consensus was that they should create a car that offered the best of both worlds – a Corvette with the distinction, performance, and style of a Ferrari, but with the power and reliability of a Chevrolet. The aim was to create a genuine high-performance GT with enough leg and headroom to meet American expectations. Once this was decided, Coltrin put Laughlin in touch with Sergio Scaglietti. With the help of Chevrolet General Manager Ed Cole, three 1959 Corvette chassis were discreetly acquired from the St. Louis Corvette plant before bodies could be fitted – one was specified with a “fuelie” and a four-speed, the others came with twin four barrels and automatics. During one of his frequent trips through Europe, Laughlin met with Sergio Scaglietti who agreed to produce a small run of bodies for the Corvette chassis. At the time, Scaglietti was busy turning out Ferrari's Tour de France and purpose-built racing cars. The Scaglietti Corvette would follow the lines of the Tour de France, albeit lines adapted to fit the Corvette's larger footprint. In an effort to impress, or perhaps, appease GM management, Laughlin specified a proper Corvette grille. The interior would be similarly hybridized with an intriguing combination of Americana – Stewart Warner gauges, T-handle parking brake, Corvette shift knob; and classic Italian GT – a purposeful crackle-finish dashboard, deeply bolstered leather seats, and elegant door hardware. 

The completed car arrived in Texas in the fall of 1960, almost 18 months after the chassis had been obtained. It proved to be the only one of the three to be finished in Italy and shipped back to the United States as a complete car. When Laughlin received the car, the fit and finish were not quite what he was expecting, especially as the project had taken nearly three years from conception to completion. Enzo Ferrari would have been quite unhappy to hear that his exclusive coachbuilder was working on side projects for a group of Texans, so, to Scaglietti's credit, the car was largely a prototype and the work was executed in a shroud of secrecy. Towards the end of the project, Carroll Shelby, who by then was living in Italy, received a late-night phone call from Ed Cole. Cole had been chastised by GM management and was told to drop the project. It was poor timing. American car companies were under pressure to cut down on their high-performance and racing programs. They simply could not deal with the repercussions of a GM-backed Italian-bodied Corvette. The remaining cars were shipped to Houston in a partially completed state. Jim Hall took delivery of one. Shelby, who had helped conceive the project, ended up declining the remaining car and it was promptly sold.

Other projects
Shelby licensed his name to many products outside of the automotive industry. Currently, his name and other trademarks associated with him are licensed to other companies by Carroll Shelby Licensing, a subsidiary of holding company Carroll Shelby International.

Carroll Shelby's name is associated with a chili fixings kit. The kit consists of spices in several packets, which used to come in a brown paper bag, but now comes in a box. On the side of the bag was a story related by Shelby cooking chili during his racing days. On the front of the bag was a depiction of a big western black hat, a trademark piece of clothing for Shelby. He was a founder of the Terlingua International Chili Championship in Terlingua, Texas. The product has since been bought by Reily Products who have discontinued the inclusion of a separate salt packet.

In 1967, Shelby marketed a men's grooming product, the "Carroll Shelby's Pit-Stop ... a Real Man's Deodorant" that was promoted in car magazines.

Shelby was the initial partner of Dan Gurney in establishing Gurney's All American Racers.

Donzi Marine developed the Donzi Shelby 22 GT, a  speedboat based on their Classic line of boats in collaboration with Carroll Shelby.

Carroll Shelby produced a line of eight-spoke alloy wheels for Saab automobiles in the early to mid-1980s. They were available in gold (Goldvane), hammered silver (Silvervane) finish, and a black hammered finish. These wheels were available through Saab dealers and could be fitted to Saab 99 and Saab 900 models manufactured through 1987.

Shelby supported a project with Rucker Performance Motorcycles to manufacture 12 Shelby motorcycles that were designed by William Rucker.

In 2008 Shelby was awarded the 2008 Automotive Executive of the Year Award.

Shelby established the Carroll Shelby Children's Foundation to cover medical bills of children who have heart disease but are unable to pay for treatment.

Memoir
Shelby wrote his memoir called The Carroll Shelby Story published in 1967 by Pocket Books. In 2019, the book was re-released by Graymalkin Media for the opening of Ford v Ferrari, a 2019 American sports drama film. The memoir describes his days as a race car driver, the challenges, the victories, and the crashes — the worst of which he describes as an “explosion.” The memoir also discusses the genesis for the revolutionary car he created, the Shelby Cobra.

Personal life

Shelby was married seven times; the first and last marriages lasted 15 years before divorce proceedings.

Shelby's first wife was Jeanne Fields; they married on December 18, 1943. They had three children: Sharon Anne (born September 27, 1944), Michael Hall (born November 2, 1946), and Patrick Bert (born October 23, 1947). They divorced in February 1960.

Shelby later admitted to an extramarital affair with Jan Harrison, an actress. In 1962, Shelby married Harrison, but the marriage was annulled the same year. His third marriage, to a New Zealand woman, which he entered in order to get her into the United States, lasted only a few weeks before ending in divorce. His fourth marriage, to Sandra Brandstetter, lasted a couple of years before ending in divorce.

In 1989, after 28 years of being single, Carroll married Cynthia Psaros, a former actress, beauty queen, and daughter of a retired US Marine colonel fighter pilot. During this marriage, Carroll received his long-awaited heart transplant. Their marriage lasted a few short years before ending in divorce. In the 1990s he married Helena "Lena" Dahl, a Swedish woman he had met in 1968. She died in a car accident in 1997. It was his only marriage that did not end in divorce, annulment, or separation.

Just four months after Dahl's death, Shelby married his last wife, Cleo (nee Rendell-Roberts), a British former model who drove rally cars. She was 25 years his junior. They were in the process of divorce when he died in 2012.

Shelby received a heart transplant in 1990, and a kidney transplant in 1996.

Shelby died on May 10, 2012, at the age of 89. He had been suffering from a serious heart ailment for decades.

Racing record

Complete Formula One World Championship results
(key)

* After retiring his original car, entered by Scuderia Centro Sud, Shelby took over Masten Gregory's car, entered by Temple Buell, and finished fourth. No points were awarded for the shared drive.

Complete 24 Hours of Le Mans results

Complete 12 Hours of Sebring results

In popular culture
Shelby is portrayed by Matt Damon in Ford v. Ferrari, a film about the 1960s rivalry between Ford and Ferrari at the Le Mans auto race and Shelby's friendship with legendary race car driver Ken Miles. It was produced by 20th Century Fox, directed by James Mangold. The film began shooting in the summer of 2018 and was released in theaters on November 15, 2019. The film premiered on September 10, 2019 at the Toronto International Film Festival.

Shelby American: The Carroll Shelby Story is a 2019 feature-length documentary about Shelby's life and career.

Shelby features prominently in Bill Cosby's comedic story "200 M.P.H." (1968). Shelby (voiced by Cosby) convinces Cosby that, since he was an American, he should drive an "American car" – specifically, a custom-made Shelby "Cobra" that was guaranteed to go 200 M.P.H., faster than any foreign sportscar. The story takes up the entire second side of Cosby's seventh album, 200 M.P.H.

See also

The Snake and the Stallion

References

Inline

General

Shelby Cobra and Ford GT Racing 
 An inside look at early Cobra racing 1962 through 1963.
 Shelby's story of his life and racing through 1964.
 A revised and enlarged version of "The Cobra Story," covering the Cobra's successes in 1965 and 1966, as well as including technical specifications for the 289 and 427 Cobras.
 Covers Cobra and Ferrari racing through 1965.
 Ford racing programs through 1967.

External links
King of the Road, The Story of Carroll Shelby a three-part documentary first aired on May 20, 2012 on Discovery World channel.

1923 births
2012 deaths
American people of English descent
American people of Dutch descent
American people of French descent
American people of Scotch-Irish descent
American Formula One drivers
American racing drivers
Scuderia Centro Sud Formula One drivers
Aston Martin Formula One drivers
American automobile designers
American founders of automobile manufacturers
Chrysler people
International Motorsports Hall of Fame inductees
People from Camp County, Texas
24 Hours of Le Mans drivers
24 Hours of Le Mans winning drivers
United States Army Air Forces officers
United States Army Air Forces pilots of World War II
Racing drivers from Dallas
Racing drivers from Texas
World Sportscar Championship drivers
Heart transplant recipients
Kidney transplant recipients
People with congenital heart defects
Ford people
Sports car racing team owners
Automotive businesspeople
Ford Mustang
Carrera Panamericana drivers